Avenel  is an unincorporated community and census-designated place (CDP) located within Woodbridge Township, in Middlesex County, New Jersey, United States. As of the 2010 United States Census, the CDP's population was 17,011.

History
The community was established in 1901; it was named for the daughter of Captain Demarest, the founder of the village, which had formerly been known as Demarest on the Hill. Besides the Demarests, the first settlers included members of the Brown, Clark, Cooper, Crowell, Douglass, Edgar, and Thorpe families.

Community
The Avenel Fire Company #1 celebrated its 100th anniversary on June 8, 2013, with a parade and picnic. The area also has three public schools: Avenel Middle School, Avenel Street School #4&5 and Woodbine Avenue School #23.

Places of worship in Avenel include the First Presbyterian Church, St. Andrew's Roman Catholic Church, Central Baptist Church and Fellowship Bible Church.

Sports teams in Avenel include the Avenel Warriors.

In 2019, the Avenel Performing Arts Center opened near the Avenel train station.  The venue features a professional recording studio.

Geography
According to the United States Census Bureau, Avenel had a total area of 3.532 square miles (9.148 km2), including 3.517 square miles (9.109 km2) of land and 0.015 square miles (0.039 km2) of water (0.42%).

Demographics

Census 2010

Census 2000
As of the 2000 United States Census there were 17,552 people, 5,233 households, and 3,799 families residing in the CDP. The population density was 1,970.0/km2 (5,099.2/mi2). There were 5,353 housing units at an average density of 600.8/km2 (1,555.2/mi2). The racial makeup of the CDP was 53.52% White, 19.66% African American, 0.35% Native American, 18.90% Asian, 0.03% Pacific Islander, 3.65% from other races, and 3.89% from two or more races. Hispanic or Latino of any race were 9.85% of the population.

There were 5,233 households, out of which 36.7% had children under the age of 18 living with them, 55.9% were married couples living together, 11.9% had a female householder with no husband present, and 27.4% were non-families. 21.6% of all households were made up of individuals, and 7.5% had someone living alone who was 65 years of age or older. The average household size was 2.73 and the average family size was 3.23.

In the CDP the population was spread out, with 20.8% under the age of 18, 6.8% from 18 to 24, 42.8% from 25 to 44, 21.0% from 45 to 64, and 8.6% who were 65 years of age or older. The median age was 36 years. For every 100 females, there were 134.3 males. For every 100 females age 18 and over, there were 145.2 males.

The median income for a household in the CDP was $54,929, and the median income for a family was $61,029. Males had a median income of $48,000 versus $31,804 for females. The per capita income for the CDP was $19,794. About 6.1% of families and 9.6% of the population were below the poverty line, including 8.1% of those under age 18 and 6.6% of those age 65 or over.

As part of the 2000 Census, 13.65% of Avenel's residents identified themselves as being Indian American. This was the fifth highest percentage of Indian people in any place in the United States with 1,000 or more residents identifying their ancestry.

Economy
Avenel was the flagship location of Bradco Supply, founded in 1966, one of the country's leading distributors of building products. The company had grown to over 130 locations in more than 30 states.

Amazon.com operates a fulfillment center in Avenel.

East Jersey State Prison is located in Avenel, near the border of Rahway; Though located in Woodbridge Township, the prison's mailing address had led to it being called "Rahway State Prison". Also located in Avenel is the Adult Diagnostic and Treatment Center, which provides treatment to convicted sex offenders.

Transportation
The Avenel station provides direct NYC service on NJ Transit's North Jersey Coast Line. Avenel Station is a direct 45-minute one-seat train ride to New York Penn Station.  Riders can also connect with the PATH train to reach lower Manhattan.

In the wake of the creation of a 500-unit development transit village near the station and requests from passengers, NJ Transit began new weekday stops at the station starting in September 2019 and that weekend service would resume for the first time since 1985.

NJ Transit provides service on the 115 route between Avenel and the Port Authority Bus Terminal.

Notable people

People who were born in, residents of, or otherwise closely associated with Avenel include:
 Antonio Alfano, American football defensive tackle for the Colorado Buffaloes.
 Eric LeGrand (born 1990), football player, writer, speaker.
 Jazlyn Moya (born 1997), footballer who plays as a forward for United Women's Soccer club New Jersey Copa FC and the Dominican Republic women's national team.
 Dagmara Wozniak (born 1988), Polish-American U.S. Olympic sabre fencer.

See also
List of neighborhoods in Woodbridge Township, New Jersey
List of neighborhoods in Edison, New Jersey
Oak Tree Road

References

External links
 Avenel Fire Company No. 1
 Avenel-Colonia First Aid Squad
 Woodbridge Township School District

Census-designated places in Middlesex County, New Jersey
Neighborhoods in Woodbridge Township, New Jersey